Radek Dejmek (born 2 February 1988, in Vrchlabí) is a Czech former football defender. Dejmek is currently managing the U15 side of Slovan Liberec.

Career

Dejmek started his career with Slavia Prague.

References

External links
 
 
 
 
 

1988 births
Living people
Czech footballers
Czech Republic youth international footballers
Czech Republic under-21 international footballers
Czech First League players
Belgian Pro League players
Ekstraklasa players
I liga players
FC Slovan Liberec players
1. FK Příbram players
SK Sparta Krč players
Korona Kielce players
Oud-Heverlee Leuven players
Pafos FC players
GKS Katowice players
Czech expatriate footballers
Expatriate footballers in Belgium
Expatriate footballers in Cyprus
Expatriate footballers in Poland
Czech expatriate sportspeople in Belgium
Czech expatriate sportspeople in Cyprus
Czech expatriate sportspeople in Poland
Association football midfielders
People from Vrchlabí
Sportspeople from the Hradec Králové Region